King James Academy Royston (KJAR) is a through school located in Royston, Hertfordshire, England. It is an academy, and opened in September 2019, as a result of the merger of the town's two middle schools, Roysia and Greneway, and its Meridian upper school. The school is spread over 2 sites, with the Meridian site now being the Senior site and the Greneway site being the Junior site.

References

External links
 https://www.kjar.org.uk/

Academies in Hertfordshire
Royston, Hertfordshire
Secondary schools in Hertfordshire
Educational institutions established in 2019
2019 establishments in England
Primary schools in Hertfordshire